The Fringe-lipped worm-eel (Schultzidia retropinnis) is an eel in the family Ophichthidae (worm/snake eels). It was described by Henry Weed Fowler in 1934. It is a marine, tropical eel which is known from the western central Pacific Ocean, including Taratara Island, Samar Island, the Philippines, the Marshall Islands, Micronesia and Solomon Island.

References

Ophichthidae
Fish described in 1934